Brian Leslie Hanna (born 7 October 1946) is an Australian former cricketer. Originally from Katanning, he played seven first-class and three List A matches for Western Australia between the 1970–71 and 1972–73 seasons. Playing mainly as a top-order batsman, he made 213 runs at an average of 17.75, with a highest score of 51 not out.

References

1946 births
Living people
Australian cricketers
People from Katanning, Western Australia
Western Australia cricketers
Cricketers from Western Australia